Eric "Astro" Teller (born 29 May 1970) is a British-American entrepreneur, computer scientist, and author, with expertise in the field of intelligent technology.

Early life and education
Teller was born in Cambridge, England, and raised in Evanston, Illinois, US. He is the son of Paul Teller, who was an instructor in the philosophy of science at the University of Illinois at Chicago and Chantal DeSoto, a buyer and clothing designer for Sears who later became a teacher of gifted children. His grandparents include both French economist and mathematician Gérard Debreu and Hungarian-born American theoretical physicist Edward Teller. He received the nickname "Astro" after high school friends compared his flat-top haircut to AstroTurf, and he reportedly had the image of cartoon dog Astro from The Jetsons painted on his car door in college.

Teller holds a Bachelor of Science in computer science from Stanford University, Master of Science in symbolic computation (symbolic and heuristic computation), also from Stanford, and a PhD in artificial intelligence from Carnegie Mellon University, where he was a recipient of a Hertz fellowship.

Career
After working as a teacher at Stanford, he became a business executive.

Since 2010, Teller has been directing Google X (which has become X) laboratories. Projects at Google X include Google Glass, Google Self-Driving Car Project, Google Contact Lens and Project Loon. Google X spun its project called Flux out into a stand-alone business in 2012. Teller gave a TED Talk at TED2016 on the importance of failure in Google X's approach to pioneering new projects. On 18 October 2016, it was announced that Teller would temporarily be in charge of X's Project Wing while the search for its next permanent leader was underway.

In 2017, Teller was honored with an Edison Achievement Award for his commitment to innovation throughout his career.

Entrepreneur
Teller was the co-founder and chairman of BodyMedia, makers of the BodyMedia FIT, Bodybugg, and Sensewear armbands (wearable devices that measure sleep, perspiration, motion, and calories burned).

He is also co-founder, director, and former CEO of Cerebellum Capital.

Speaker
In May 2001, Teller was featured on NPR's radio program All Things Considered, discussing how the good economy has shaped the attitudes of 30-year-olds towards their jobs. Teller is the co-founder and co-host of the Solve for X annual event and internet community.

He has lectured at the TEDMED Conference (2003 and 2004), South By Southwest (2013), and ideaCity (2004). In 2008, he appeared as a political commentator on the national French television station France 24.

Author
Teller's novel, Exegesis, was published in 1997. It was translated into Dutch, Japanese, Danish, German, Italian, and Greeklish.

A second novel, Among These Savage Thoughts, was published in 2006. An experimental novel, it deals with the protagonist's journey to reinvent himself in the imaginary mountain society of Karabas.

His third book, Sacred Cows, is a non-fiction work examining society's attitudes about marriage and divorce, co-written with his wife Danielle Teller. It was published by Diversion Books in 2014 and in the same year he gave a TEDxBoston talk on the book.

Personal life
Teller is married to Danielle Teller.

Notes

References

External links
 
 Cerebellum Capital

1970 births
Living people
Google employees
American computer scientists
American computer businesspeople
Alphabet Inc. people
American technology company founders
Artificial intelligence researchers
British emigrants to the United States
Businesspeople in software
Stanford University alumni
Businesspeople in information technology
Carnegie Mellon University alumni
American people of Hungarian-Jewish descent
British transhumanists
People from Evanston, Illinois
People from Cambridge